Harold Davies may refer to:

 Harold Davies, Baron Davies of Leek (1904–1985), British Labour politician
 Harold Davies (rugby union) (1898–1976), Welsh international rugby union player
 Harold Davies (Australian footballer) (1932–2002), Australian rules footballer for St Kilda
 Harold Davies (civil engineer) (1903–2009), Australian civil engineer
 E. Harold Davies (Edward Harold Davies, 1867–1947), professor of music at Adelaide University

See also
Harold Davis (disambiguation)
Harry Davies (disambiguation)